Galaxy 9 (G-9) was a geostationary communication satellite built by Hughes. It was located at an orbital position of 81 degrees west longitude and was initially operated by PanAmSat and later by Intelsat. The satellite was based on the HS-376 platform and its life expectancy was 15 years. The satellite was successfully launched into space on May 23, 1996, at 01:09:59 UTC, by means of a Delta II vehicle from Cape Canaveral Air Force Station, United States. It had a launch mass of 3080 pounds (1397 kg).

The Galaxy 9 was equipped with 24 (plus 6 spare) C-band transponders to provide services to South America.

External links 
 Galaxy 9 SatBeams

References 

Satellites using the HS-376 bus